Beniwal is an Indian Jaat surname and it may refer to 
 Hanuman Beniwal, Indian politician
 Kamla Beniwal, Indian politician
 Puneet Beniwal, Indian actor
 Sonu Beniwal, footballer
 Vidya Beniwal, Indian politician